Bed bug or bed bugs may refer to:

 Bed bug within the living environment and their health effects
 Cimex, a genus of small nocturnal insect of which members cause bed bug infestations

Culture
 Bedbugs (album), a 1993 album by the band  Odds
 "Bedbugs and Ballyhoo", a single by Echo & the Bunnymen that was released in 1987
 The Bedbug, play by Vladimir Mayakovsky

Place
 Ione, California, formerly called "Bedbug" and "Bed Bug"